The Kazakh Uplands (Saryarqa - "Yellow Ridge"), also known as the Kazakh Hummocks, is a large peneplain formation extending throughout the central and eastern regions of Kazakhstan.

Administratively the Kazakh Uplands stretch across the East Kazakhstan, Pavlodar, Akmola, Ulytau and Karaganda regions. Several notable cities, including the country's capital, Astana, are located in the uplands. There are large deposits of coal in the north and copper in the south.

Geography
The Kazakh Uplands are limited by the West Siberian Plain to the north, the Irtysh valley to the northeast, the Balkhash-Alakol Basin to the south and southeast, the Turan Lowland to the southwest and by the Turgay Depression to the west. 

Rivers such as the Ishim, Sileti, Sarysu, Nura, Kulanotpes, Ashchysu, Tundik and Uly-Zhylanshyk have their sources in the uplands. Lake Tengiz lies in an intermontane basin of the uplands and is the largest of the area. The Kokshetau Lakes are an important tourist attraction.

Subranges
The uplands include mountain ranges of moderate altitude separated by elevated flat intermontane basins. The main ones are:   
Kyzylarai, highest point Aksoran, 
Karkaraly Range, highest point Zhirensakal, 
Kokshetau Hills, a subrange of the uplands
Kokshetau Massif, highest point Mount Kokshe, 
Kent Range, highest point Mount Kent, 
Bayanaul Range, highest point Akbet, 
Ulutau, highest point Akmeshit, 
Kyzyltas, highest point Kushoky, 
Degelen, highest point 
Chingiztau, highest point Kosoba, 
Bektauata, highest point 
Mount Ku, highest point 
Bakty Range, highest point Mount Aktau 
Myrzhyk, highest point Yegibai 
Khankashty, highest point 
Semizbughy, highest point 
Ayr Mountains, highest point Zhosaly 
Zheltau, highest point 
Kyzyltau, highest point 
Keshubai, highest point 
Bugyly, highest point Burkit, 
Yereymentau Mountains, highest point Akdym,

Ecology
Parts of the Kazakh Uplands are included in the Saryarka – Steppe and Lakes of Northern Kazakhstan World Heritage Site. It belongs to the Palearctic temperate grasslands, savannas, and shrublands ecoregion of the temperate grasslands, savannas, and shrublands biome. The Karkaraly National Park, Kokshetau National Park, Burabay National Park and Bayanaul National Park are protected areas in the ranges of the upland. Rare species, such as the Asiatic cheetah, may still live in the region.

See also
Geography of Kazakhstan

References

External links

 Kazakh Uplands Encyclopædia Britannica
 Kazakh Uplands on "Nomadic Travel Kazakhstan" web-site